Hassane Fofana (born 28 April 1992) is an Italian athlete specialising in the high hurdles. He is of Ivorian descent. He competed at the 2020 Summer Olympics, in 110 m hurdles.

Biography
His personal bests are 13.44 seconds in the 110 metres hurdles (+1.5 m/s, Turku 2019, and also +1.1, Geneva 2021) and 7.66 seconds in the 60 metres hurdles (Ancona 2018). he won six times the national championships.

Achievements

National titles
 Italian Athletics Championships
 110 metres hurdles: 2013, 2014, 2015, 2016, 2019, 2022
Italian Athletics Indoor Championships
 110 metres hurdles: 2015, 2017, 2018

See also
 Italian all-time lists - 110 metres hurdles

References

External links
 
 
 

1992 births
Living people
Italian male hurdlers
Sportspeople from the Province of Brescia
Italian people of Ivorian descent
Italian sportspeople of African descent
Athletes (track and field) at the 2018 Mediterranean Games
World Athletics Championships athletes for Italy
Athletes (track and field) at the 2019 European Games
European Games medalists in athletics
European Games gold medalists for Italy
Athletics competitors of Fiamme Oro
Italian Athletics Championships winners
Mediterranean Games competitors for Italy
Athletes (track and field) at the 2020 Summer Olympics
Olympic athletes of Italy
21st-century Italian people